I Spy is an American secret-agent adventure television series that ran for three seasons on NBC from September 15, 1965, to April 15, 1968, and teamed US intelligence agents Kelly Robinson (Robert Culp) and Alexander "Scotty" Scott (Bill Cosby), traveling undercover as international "tennis bums." Robinson poses as an amateur with Scott as his trainer, playing against wealthy opponents in return for food and lodging. Their work involved chasing villains, spies, and beautiful women.

The creative forces behind the show were writers David Friedkin and Morton Fine and cinematographer Fouad Said. Together they formed Triple F Productions under the aegis of Desilu Productions where the show was produced. Fine and Friedkin (who previously wrote scripts for radio's Broadway Is My Beat and Crime Classics under producer-director Elliott Lewis) were co-producers and head writers, and wrote the scripts for 16 episodes, one of which Friedkin directed. Friedkin also dabbled in acting and appeared in two episodes in the first season.

Actor-producer Sheldon Leonard, known for playing gangster roles in the 1940s and 1950s, was the executive producer (receiving top billing before the title in the series' opening title sequence). He also played a gangster-villain role in two episodes and appeared in a third show as himself in a humorous cameo. In addition, he directed one episode and served as occasional second-unit director throughout the series.

Background

Characters and settings
I Spy broke ground in that it was the first American television drama to feature a black actor (Cosby) in a lead role. Originally an older actor was slated to play a fatherly mentor to Culp's character. After seeing Cosby performing stand-up comedy on a talk-show, Sheldon Leonard decided to take a chance on hiring him to play opposite Culp. The concept was changed from a mentor-protégé relationship to same-age partners who were equals. It was also notable that Cosby's race was never an issue in any of the stories, though on occasion oblique references surfaced (such as in the second-season episode "One Of Our Bombs Is Missing," in which Scott jokingly said that he would "join the Klan," if it would help them recover a lost atomic bomb). Nor was his character in any way subservient to Culp's, with the exception that Culp's "Kelly Robinson" was a more experienced agent. (Culp revealed in his audio commentary on the DVD release that he and Cosby agreed early on that "Our statement is a non-statement" regarding race, and the subject was never discussed again.) As a strait-laced Rhodes Scholar fluent in many languages, Cosby's "Scotty" was really the brains of the team. His partner was the athlete and playboy who lived by his wits.

I Spy was a trailblazer in its use of exotic international locations in an attempt to emulate the James Bond film series. This was unique for a television show, especially since the series actually filmed its lead actors at locations ranging from Spain to Japan, rather than relying on stock footage. Compare with the more recent series, Alias, which also utilized worldwide settings but rarely filmed outside the Los Angeles region. Contrast the extensive use of location shooting with I Spy's contemporaries on NBC Mission: Impossible and The Man from U.N.C.L.E., which were mostly filmed on the Desilu and MGM back lots, respectively. Location filming is expensive and requires significantly more planning than studio filming, but the resulting quality was key to I Spy's success. Each season the producers would select four or five scenic locations around the world and create stories that took advantage of the local attractions. Episodes were filmed in Hong Kong, Athens, Rome, Florence, Madrid, Venice, Tokyo, Mexico City, Acapulco, San Francisco, Las Vegas, and Morocco.

The success of the show is primarily attributed to the chemistry between Culp and Cosby. Fans tuned in more for their hip banter than for the espionage stories, making I Spy a leader in the buddy genre. The two actors quickly developed a close friendship that mirrored their on-screen characters, a friendship that would last until Culp's death in 2010. The show also coined unique phrases that, briefly, became catchphrases, such as "wonderfulness". Wonderfulness was used as the title of one of Cosby's albums of stand-up comedy released concurrently with the series. Cosby also occasionally slipped in bits of his comic routines during his improvised badinage with Culp. (In one episode Scott, being interrogated under the influence of drugs, says his name is Fat Albert.) Many details of Cosby's life were also written into his character. Scott does not drink or smoke—while Kelly Robinson does both. There are frequent references to Scott's childhood in Philadelphia and attending Temple University (Cosby is sometimes seen wearing his own Temple sweatshirt), and in the "Cops and Robbers" episode, Scotty returns home to Philadelphia to revisit his old neighborhood.

Comedy and drama

I Spy was a fixture in the popular secret agent genre of the 1960s—a trend that began with the James Bond films. By 1965, virtually every studio was producing secret agent TV shows, films, and spin-off merchandise.  What set I Spy apart from contemporary programs such as The Man from U.N.C.L.E., The Avengers, and The Wild Wild West was its emphasis on realism. There were no fanciful 007-style gadgets, outlandish villains or campy, tongue-in-cheek humor. Although Culp and Cosby frequently exchanged breezy, lighthearted dialog, the stories invariably focused on the gritty, ugly side of the espionage business.

Occasionally the series produced purely comedic episodes such as "Chrysanthemum," inspired by The Pink Panther, and "Mainly on the Plains" with Boris Karloff as an eccentric scientist who thinks he's Don Quixote. However, most episodes dealt with more serious subjects (e.g., heroin addiction in "The Loser") and did not shy away from ending on a somber note.  It was also one of the very few American dramatic television series of the 1960s (The Twilight Zone was another) to set an episode in the then-taboo region of Vietnam.  The 1966 episode was "The Tiger," written by Robert Culp, and during filming a romance ensued between Culp and Vietnamese–French guest star France Nuyen.  The two were married the following year, and Nuyen went on to appear in several more episodes.

Plotlines and stories
The espionage plots were, with a few exceptions, realistically set in the Cold War and the real life geopolitics of the mid-1960’s.  They often specifically referred to their opponents as “the Russians”, or “the Chinese”, or other Communist Bloc countries of the time.  Only rarely was a fictitious city or country used as a plot device.  The espionage plots were almost always plausible – with a couple of comedic exceptions – and actual Cold War events were frequently alluded to or used as the basis for a plot.  Other contemporary geopolitical factors that appeared in certain episodes were Arab nationalism and the idea of Jihad, domestic terrorism within the United States itself, Neofascist organizations, and escaped war criminals from World War II.

The name of the espionage unit they worked for was never specified.  In one flashback episode, it is established that all agents took their original training at The Presidio Army post in San Francisco, and that the agency was “more military than the CIA”.  At least two episodes begin with them receiving a briefing at the Pentagon, they frequently refer to the Pentagon as their headquarters, and they are frequently seen receiving instructions from uniformed high ranking military officers.  However, they also seem to be answerable to the State Department as well, frequently getting instructions at the local Embassy in the nation they are operating in.  In at least one episode they directly refer to the American ambassador as someone who can assist them. The fictional agency they work for is often called “The Department”, but its actual identity is left to the imagination of the viewer.

The two agents sometimes engage in standard espionage activities like interrogation of defectors and assisting friendly agents returning from enemy territory.  However, the two main characters themselves are only twice shown operating behind the Iron or Bamboo Curtain and once in Viet Cong controlled territory.  They spend all other episodes operating in the US itself or countries allied to the U.S. – NATO allies Greece, Italy and British Hong Kong; U.S. ally Japan; OAS member Mexico; and U.S. unofficial (at the time) ally Spain.  Likewise Morocco was a technically neutral, but pro-West country at the time. They cooperate with British and Greek intelligence officers in various episodes and with local Japanese and Mexican police officials in others, but largely their activities are unknown to the local authorities.  The two agents are most often seen uncovering and eliminating Soviet Bloc or Chinese espionage activities in Western nations, or uncovering a traitor in their own organization – activities which technically make them Counter-Intelligence agents.  Occasionally they are involved  against narcotic smuggling or thwarting coup attempt against a friendly ruler.  In some episodes they are not actually on an assignment at all but have an adventure related to their personal lives, such as helping keep Scotty’s foster-daughter's boyfriend out of trouble, or dealing with the angry family of a soldier who had served under Kelly in the Korean War years before and had been killed in action.

Episodes

Season 1: 1965–66

Season 2: 1966–67

Season 3: 1967–68

Culp as writer
Top-billed series star Culp wrote the scripts for seven episodes (one of which he also directed), including the show's first broadcast episode, "So Long, Patrick Henry."  Prior to joining I Spy, Culp wrote a pilot script for a proposed series in which he would have played an American character like James Bond. He took the script to his friend Carl Reiner, who recommended he meet with Sheldon Leonard, who was in the midst of creating I Spy. This script was eventually rewritten by Culp and produced as the episode "The Tiger." In the DVD audio commentary for the "Home to Judgment" episode, Culp reveals that his seven episodes were the only ones filmed exactly as written.  He wrote them to establish a specific dramatic tone and level of quality for the other writers to follow. Nevertheless, Culp and Cosby were often dissatisfied with the frivolous and formulaic scripts they received and rewrote most of their dialog and improvised a great deal during filming.

Awards and nominations
 First-time actor Bill Cosby won three consecutive Emmy Awards for Outstanding Lead Actor in a Drama Series in 1966, 1967 and 1968 (becoming the first African-American male actor to do so). Robert Culp was also nominated in the same category for all three seasons of I Spy.
 Eartha Kitt, who played a drug-addicted cabaret singer in "The Loser" (written by Culp), was nominated in 1966 for an Emmy Award for Outstanding Single Performance by an Actress in a Leading Role in a Drama.
 In 1967 Culp was nominated for an Emmy for Outstanding Writing Achievement in a Drama for his third-season script "Home to Judgment."
 In addition to writing the theme music, Earle Hagen composed an original musical score for many episodes of the series, often flavored with the ethnic music of the Far East, Mexico or the Caribbean. Hagen received Emmy nominations for all three seasons of the show and won for the "Laya" episode in 1968.
 I Spy won as "Best Dramatic Series" at the 1967 Golden Globe Awards for its 1966–1967 season.

Remakes
In I Spy Returns (1994), a nostalgic television movie (and unsold pilot episode for a new series), Culp and Cosby reprised their roles as Robinson and Scott for the first time since 1968. The original opening title sequence is reused with no changes other than the addition of the word 'Returns' beneath 'I Spy' and a new arrangement of the theme music. Cosby was the executive producer. Unlike the original series, the TV-movie was shot on videotape instead of film. Here, Robinson has become director of the agency, while Scott has left the business.  However, the aging agents have to leap into action once again, this time to keep an eye on their children, Bennett Robinson (George Newbern) and Nicole Scott (Salli Richardson-Whitfield) who are now operatives. This was shown as a "CBS Movie Special" on February 3, 1994.

Culp again reprised the role of Kelly Robinson during a dream sequence in a 1999 episode of Bill Cosby's series Cosby titled "My Spy." Cosby's character falls asleep while watching I Spy on television and dreams he's caught up in an espionage adventure. With Cosby's name replaced with that of his character here, Hilton Lucas, the old title sequence was again faithfully recreated. (Culp had earlier appeared with Cosby in 1987 on The Cosby Show episode "Bald and Beautiful" as Cliff Huxtable's old friend "Scott Kelly", a merger of their I Spy characters' names.)

A movie remake, also titled I Spy, followed in 2002 with Eddie Murphy and Owen Wilson. In this iteration, the character names are reversed, so Alexander Scott (Wilson) is now the white secret agent and Kelly Robinson (Murphy) the black athlete, now a boxer (It also changed the original premise of them both being agents, with Robinson being a civilian boxer who is essentially brought in to act as Scott's cover story while he carries out his mission). The film was initially a commercial and critical failure. In his 2009 Movie Guide, film critic Leonard Maltin describes the film as an "In-name-only reincarnation of the smart 1960s TV show.... An object lesson in bad screenwriting, with an incoherent story, and characters that make no sense."

The original television series and the 1994 reunion movie are both available on DVD.  Episodes 1–25 of the first season of the television series are also available on Joost and all 82 episodes are available on Videosurf, from the DMGI Classics channel, and can be streamed on Hulu.

Get Smart, the spy-spoof television series, did a parody of the show in the 1968 episode titled "Die Spy".  In this, agent Maxwell Smart (Don Adams) pretends to be an international table-tennis champion.  The episode faithfully recreates the theme music, montage graphics, and back-and-forth banter between Robinson and Scott—with actor/comedian Stu Gilliam imitating Cosby. Robert Culp makes an uncredited cameo appearance as an inebriated Turkish waiter.

Merchandising

Original novels, comic books, and reference books

A number of original novels based upon the series were published, most written in the mid-to-late 1960s by Walter Wager under the pseudonym "John Tiger."  The I Spy novels were published by Popular Library:

 I Spy (1965, no book series number on cover)
 I SPY #2: Masterstroke (1966)
 I SPY #3: Superkill (1967)
 I SPY #4: Wipeout (1967)
 I SPY #5: Countertrap (1967)
 I SPY #6: Doomdate (1967)
 I SPY #7: Death-Twist (1968)

The following tie-ins, not by Wager, were also published.

 Message From Moscow (1966) by Brandon Keith. This was a hardcover novel published for young readers by Whitman.
 I Spy (2002) by Max Allan Collins – novelization of the motion picture remake

Gold Key Comics also published six issues of an I Spy comic book between 1966 and 1968.

 I Spy: A History and Episode Guide to the Groundbreaking Television Series by Marc Cushman and Linda J. LaRosa

Soundtracks
Unlike many television series of the time, every episode of I Spy received an original score – as was the case with the other shows from Sheldon Leonard, like The Andy Griffith Show and The Dick Van Dyke Show. Earle Hagen, Leonard's regular composer, wrote the main theme and scored most of the episodes (collaborating on three with Carl Brandt; Hugo Friedhofer, Nathan Van Cleave, Robert Drasnin and Shorty Rogers also wrote music for the series).  During the show's run, two albums of re-recorded music composed (except where indicated) and conducted by Hagen were released.

Music from the Television Series I Spy (Warner Bros. WS-1637):
 I Spy (1:57)
 Tatia (3:00)
 Hi Yo Scotty (2:42)
 Angel (2:44)
 Away We Go To Tokyo (2:25)
 Rickshaw Ride (2:50)
 Away We Go To Mexico (2:18)
 Ah So! (2:16)
 The International Set (2:23)
 Another Kind Of Blues (2:46)
 Fiesta Del Sol (2:05)
 The Wonderfulness of You (2:23)
 Made In Hong Kong (2:17)

I Spy (Capitol ST-2839):
 I Spy (2:10)
 Over The Wall (2:15)
 Montezuma's Revenge (2:25)
 Islands In The Sea (3:06)
 The Golden Age (2:08)
 The Voice In The Wind (Earle Hagen and Gene Lees) (2:58)
 To Florence With Love (Hugo Friedhofer) (2:20)
 Sophia (2:40)
 Rots Of Ruck (2:20)
 There's No Escape (3:40)
 Domingo (2:25)
 The International Set (2:21)

In 2002 Film Score Monthly released a limited-edition disc of original soundtrack music from the series.

 "So Long Patrick Henry": The Defector/Main Title (1:05)
 Hong Kong/Elroy (1:25)
 What's the Trouble? (1:05)
 Keep Running/You Lose (4:10)
 That's My Man (1:27)
 Stop That Plane (2:25)
 The Whistle Blows (2:14)
 "007" (:45)
 End Title (:52)
 "The Time Of The Knife": Tokyo/Jean and Kelly/Jean's Pad/Trailing (6:19)
 Oops, the Troops!/Away We Go/Shiftycraft/Dead for Real (3:32)
 "Turkish Delight": Away We Go to Mexico/Bye Bye Scotty/Rapido/On the Road Again/Trunk Store/Chicken Hearts/Lt Hernandez (5:14)
 Taxi Tour (2:01)
 Japanese Trick/Parting Is Such Sweet Sorrow/How About That/Babe, With Rocks (5:15)
 End Title (:38)
 "The Warlord": Burma/The Chase/And On and On/Of Some Value (9:14)
 My Lord/She Is Chinese (4:47)
 Prelude to Dreamsville/The General Dies (4:12)
 Down the River (1:55)
 "Mainly On The Plains": The Plaza/Main Title (3:19)
 Don Silvando/Blonde Gothic/Travelin'/Sighted (3:37)
 Don Quixote II/Attack/Upsy Daisy (4:45)
 My Professor, the Nut/Wild Stuff/Goodbye Crooks (3:55)
 Don Strikes/So Long, Don (2:41)
 End Title (:38)

Home media
The underlying rights to the original series are now owned by independent film company Peter Rodgers Organization, Ltd. (PRO), but original production company Triple F Productions remains the copyright holder.

Selected episodes of the series were made available on VHS in North America in the early 1990s.

Image Entertainment released the complete series on DVD in Region 1 in 2002, initially in a series of single-disc volumes (each with four episodes), which were later compiled into three box sets. The episodes were not presented in any particular order.  In addition, Sony Pictures Home Entertainment released the 1994 reunion made-for-TV film on DVD in Region 1 on October 8, 2002.

In April 2008, Image/PRO reissued the series, this time organized in order of original broadcast, in three box sets, one for each season. This includes Robert Culp's bonus audio commentary on four episodes that he wrote (originally issued in 2002 on a single DVD called The Robert Culp Collection).

On March 7, 2014, it was announced that Timeless Media Group had acquired the rights to the series in Region 1 and will be releasing a complete series set on June 24, 2014.

In Region 4, Umbrella Entertainment has released all 3 seasons on DVD in Australia.

Syndication 
In September 1982 the religious cable channel Christian Broadcasting Network began airing I Spy nationwide on weeknights at 8:00 PM, and continued to do so for the next 2+ years.  In 1986, Nick at Nite added I Spy to its evening lineup at 9:00 and continued to air the program until the Fall of 1987  In 2011, I Spy aired twice a day, six days a week, on FamilyNet. The series also airs in the United States on broadcast television channels Retro Television Network and the Soul of the South Network. In 2015, reruns of I Spy were pulled by the Aspire and Cozi TV networks as a result of allegations of sexual assault by Cosby.

References

External links

 
  I SPY: A History to the Groundreaking Television Series, info on 2007 book
 Sound samples of the TV series score

1960s American comedy-drama television series
1965 American television series debuts
1968 American television series endings
American action television series
American adventure television series
English-language television shows
American spy television series
Gold Key Comics titles
NBC original programming
Television shows adapted into films
Television shows adapted into comics
Television series by CBS Studios
Television shows set in Washington, D.C.
Tennis culture
Espionage television series